Cleistocactus is a genus of flowering plants in the cactus family Cactaceae, native to mountainous areas - to  - of South America (Peru, Uruguay, Bolivia and Argentina). The name comes from the Greek kleistos meaning closed because the flowers hardly open.

The stems of these cacti are tall, mostly slender and often many-branched with numerous ribs with closely set areoles and spines. The flowers are tubular and the tips hardly open with only the style and stamens usually protruding.

Species

Natural Hybrids 
 Cleistocactus × crassiserpens Rauh & Backeb.(Cleistocactus icosagonus × Cleistocactus serpens).

Synonyms
The following genera have been brought into synonymy with this genus:
Akersia Buining
Bolivicereus Cárdenas
Borzicactella H.Johnson ex F.Ritter
Borzicactus Riccob
Borzicereus Fric & Kreuz. (orth. var.)
Cephalocleistocactus F.Ritter
Cleistocereus Fric & Kreuz. (orth. var.)
Clistanthocereus Backeb.
Demnosa Fric
Gymnanthocereus Backeb.
Hildewintera F.Ritter
Loxanthocereus Backeb.
Maritimocereus Akers
Pseudoechinocereus Buining (nom. inval.)
Seticereus Backeb.
Seticleistocactus Backeb.
Winteria F.Ritter
Winterocereus Backeb.

References

 Innes C, Wall B (1995).  Cacti, Succulents and Bromaliads.  Cassell & The Royal Horticultural Society.
The species list is referenced from http://www.cactiguide.com/ which is in turn referenced from several books which are listed on that site.  The principal book listed here is The Cactus Family by Edward F. Anderson.

External links 

   photos on www.AIAPS.org
   photos on www.cactiguide.com

Trichocereeae
Cacti of South America
Flora of Argentina
Flora of Bolivia
Flora of Peru
Flora of Uruguay
Cactoideae genera